Clarence H Callender (born 16 November 1961 in East Ham) is a male British former sprinter.

Athletics career
Callender competed in the 1988 Summer Olympics. He represented England and competed in the 100 metres and won a silver medal in the 4 × 100 metres relay event, at the 1986 Commonwealth Games in Edinburgh, Scotland. Four years later he represented England and won a gold medal in the 4 × 100 metres relay event with John Regis, Marcus Adam, Linford Christie and Tony Jarrett (heat runner), at the 1990 Commonwealth Games in Auckland, New Zealand. In the 1989 IAAF World Cup, his team won second place in the 4 × 100 m relay.

References

1961 births
Living people
Athletes from London
British male sprinters
English male sprinters
Olympic athletes of Great Britain
Athletes (track and field) at the 1988 Summer Olympics
Commonwealth Games silver medallists for England
Commonwealth Games gold medallists for England
Commonwealth Games medallists in athletics
Athletes (track and field) at the 1986 Commonwealth Games
Athletes (track and field) at the 1990 Commonwealth Games
People from East Ham
Medallists at the 1986 Commonwealth Games
Medallists at the 1990 Commonwealth Games